Pixie Mountain is a mountain in the North Carolina High Country, in the community of Linville. Its elevation reaches . The mountain is adjacent to the Linville River.

The Linville Bypass (NC Hwy 181) goes around Pixie Mountain on its western side; while the majority of the Linville community is on its East and North.

References

Mountains of North Carolina
Mountains of Avery County, North Carolina